Stoker may refer to:

Arts and entertainment
 "The Stoker", a 1927 short story by Franz Kafka
 The Stoker (1932 film), an American drama/romance film directed by Chester M. Franklin
 The Stoker (1935 film) , a British comedy film directed by Leslie Pearce
 A Stoker, a 2010 Russian crime film
 Stoker (film), a 2013 American psychological thriller film directed by Park Chan-wook
 "Stoker" (Sliders), a television episode
 The title character of Stoker the Broker (1960–1985) a US comic strip
 Bram Stoker Award for horror writing
 Stoker (band), a South African hard rock band

People
 Stoker (surname), a list of notable people with the surname
 Bram Stoker (1847-1912), Irish author, wrote Dracula
 Walter Stoker Edwards (1900-1964), British politician
 Andy "Stoker" Growcott (born 1959), a former member of the band Dexys Midnight Runners
 Stoker (occupation), the person who tends the fire for the running of a steam engine
 The person on the rear seat of a tandem bicycle, i.e. the one who delivers power to the machine

Other uses
 Fire iron, used for shifting burning coals in a hearth
 Mechanical stoker, a machine which replaces the human occupation
 Cleveland Stokers (1967–68), an American soccer team
 Stoker Island, South Shetland Islands, Antarctica
 The Stoker Company, a pesticide producer and applier in Imperial County, California